Ted Thorne (John “Ted” Thorne) (October 16, 1929 in Detroit, Michigan – April 3, 2007, in Michigan City, Indiana), at 17 became the youngest sports editor of a daily newspaper in the state of Indiana, the News-Dispatch in Michigan City. He was a television newscaster at WGN in Chicago during the mid-1950s and early 1960s.

Despite being a resident of Michigan City, Thorne influenced public opinion in Gary where he was news and program director of the radio station WWCA. Thorne hosted the popular noontime program, Sound-Off. He also delivered expanded newscasts at 12pm and 5pm. He was also briefly the news director at station WLOI in LaPorte, Indiana, a sister station to WWCA. In the 1960s, Thorne was the television host for Chicago's WTTW, when that station aired the Northwest Indiana regional basketball tournaments each winter.

From 1978 to 1983, he was general manager of WIMS Radio in Michigan City. His career allowed him to travel worldwide and to meet notable politicians and personalities including U.S. presidents Kennedy, Nixon, Carter and Reagan. Thorne also interviewed baseball legends Ernie Banks and Ted Williams and the film stars Paul Newman and James Stewart.

He hosted several local events including the Miss Gary and Miss Indiana scholarship pageants. He graduated from Elston High School in Michigan City in 1947 and attended Indiana University. He was a member of the Indiana Association of Broadcasters and the Michigan City Exchange Club. 

Thorne married Nancy L. Schrader in 1951. She predeceased him in 1993. They had two children, Deborah, who married Brian Armstrong and had two children, Ian and Emily Armstrong; and Jeffrey, who married Joanne, and had two children, Jennelle and Julia Thorne. 

1929 births
2007 deaths